Smithville High School is a public high school in Smithville, Ohio.  It is the only high school in the Green Local Schools district.  Their nickname is the Smithies, which was a nickname given to the school's teams by an early sports editor of the Wooster Daily Record. The colors of green and white came from the town's location within Green Township.  Long-time athletic director and coach Wilbur Berkey designed the horseshoe and anvil logo the school uses.

In 1955, Marshallville's district was merged with Smithville's.  This was done in order to prevent the transporting of Marshallville students across Orrville's district into Dalton, where Marshallville had sent their students since their school's closure in 1938.  The merger enabled Smithville to start up a football program in the WCAL.  The Marshallville Tigers had previously competed in the WCAL as well.

Due to the recent success of all three teams, Smithville's football team also has a strong rivalry with both the Dalton High School Bulldogs and the  Waynedale High School Golden Bears.  All three schools have combined to either share or outright win the WCAL football title 44 times from 1960 to 2019, and in that time frame there have only been 16 seasons where none of the three have contributed to a football championship.

In 2014, Smithville High School, Greene Middle School, Smithville Elementary and Marshallville Elementary were all combined into one new K-12 building, and the old buildings demolished.

References

External links
 District Website
 School Website

High schools in Wayne County, Ohio
Public high schools in Ohio